Cytochrome c oxidase subunit 5a is a protein that in humans is encoded by the COX5A gene. Cytochrome c oxidase 5A is a subunit of the cytochrome c oxidase complex, also known as Complex IV, the last enzyme in the mitochondrial electron transport chain.

Structure 

The COX5A gene, located on the q arm of chromosome 15 in position 24.1, is made up of 5 exons and is 17,880 base pairs in length. The COX5A protein weighs 17 kDa and is composed of 150 amino acids. The protein is a subunit of Complex IV, which consists of 13 mitochondrial- and nuclear-encoded subunits.

Function 

Cytochrome c oxidase (COX) is the terminal enzyme of the mitochondrial respiratory chain. It is a multi-subunit enzyme complex that couples the transfer of electrons from cytochrome c to molecular oxygen and contributes to a proton electrochemical gradient across the inner mitochondrial membrane to drive ATP synthesis via protonmotive force.  The mitochondrially-encoded subunits perform the electron transfer of proton pumping activities. The functions of the nuclear-encoded subunits are unknown but they may play a role in the regulation and assembly of the complex.

Summary reaction:
 4 Fe2+-cytochrome c + 8 H+in + O2 → 4 Fe3+-cytochrome c + 2 H2O + 4 H+out

Clinical significance 

COX5A (this gene) and COX5B are involved in the regulation of cancer cell metabolism by Bcl-2. COX5A interacts specifically with Bcl-2, but not with other members of the Bcl-2 family, such as Bcl-xL, Bax or Bak.

The Trans-activator of transcription protein (Tat) of human immunodeficiency virus (HIV) inhibits cytochrome c oxidase (COX) activity in permeabilized mitochondria isolated from both mouse and human liver, heart, and brain samples.

References

Further reading

External links 
 
 Mass spectrometry characterization of COX5A at COPaKB

Proteins